Anders Per Järryd (born 13 July 1961) is a former professional tennis player from Sweden. During his career he won eight Grand Slam doubles titles (three French Open, two Wimbledon, two US Open, one Australian Open), reached the world No. 1 doubles ranking, and achieved a career-high singles ranking of world No. 5.

Järryd was born in Lidköping, Västra Götaland. While growing up he also played bandy in Lidköpings AIK.

Career
Järryd turned professional in 1980. He won his first tour doubles title in 1981 in Linz, Austria. One year later he captured his first top-level singles title, also at Linz. In 1983, Järryd won his first Grand Slam doubles title at the French Open, partnering his fellow Swede Hans Simonsson. Järryd had a strong year in 1984, winning two singles and four doubles titles. He also finished runner-up in the men's doubles at the US Open that year, partnering Stefan Edberg.

1985 saw Järryd's career-best Grand Slam singles performance, when he beat Claudio Panatta, Scott Davis, Vincent Van Patten, Danie Visser and Heinz Günthardt to reach the semi-finals at Wimbledon before being knocked out in four sets by Boris Becker. Järryd reached his career-high singles ranking of world No. 5 in July 1985, and captured the world No. 1 doubles ranking that August. At the French Open and US Open, Järryd progressed to career-best finishes in those two tournaments, finishing the fourth round and quarterfinal respectively. In 1986 he won the WCT Finals by beating Boris Becker in the final, while he and Edberg were the men's doubles runners-up at the French Open.

Järryd won three of the four Grand Slam men's doubles titles in 1987, at the Australian Open (partnering Edberg), French Open (partnering Robert Seguso) and US Open (partnering Edberg). Järryd was also a member of Swedish team which won the Davis Cup that year. He won two singles rubbers in the final where Sweden beat India 5–0. (Järryd also played on three Swedish teams which finished runners-up in the Davis Cup in 1986, 1988 and 1989.)

In 1988, Järryd partnered John Fitzgerald to finish runner-up in the men's doubles at both the French Open and Wimbledon. Järryd also won a men's doubles bronze medal at the Olympic Games that year, partnering Edberg. Järryd was also a member of the Swedish team which won the World Team Cup in 1988. In the following year he partnered Fitzgerald to win the men's doubles title at Wimbledon, thus completing a career set of all four Grand Slam men's doubles titles. 1991 again saw Järryd capture three of the four men's doubles titles, as he partnered Fitzgerald to win the French Open, Wimbledon and US Open, his last Grand Slam titles. Järryd reached his last Grand Slam doubles final at the 1993 Australian Open, as part of the same partnership.

Over the course of his career, Järryd won eight top-level singles titles and 58 tour doubles titles. His final singles title came in 1993 at Rotterdam. He won his last doubles title in 1995 at St. Petersburg, and retired from the professional tour in 1996.

Grand Slam finals

Doubles (8 titles, 5 runner-ups)

Career finals

Singles: 24 (8 titles, 16 runner-ups)

Doubles: 91 (58 titles, 33 runner-ups)

Grand Slam doubles performance timeline

External links
 
 
 
 
 

Swedish male tennis players
Australian Open (tennis) champions
French Open champions
US Open (tennis) champions
Wimbledon champions
Olympic tennis players of Sweden
Tennis players at the 1988 Summer Olympics
Tennis players at the 1992 Summer Olympics
Olympic bronze medalists for Sweden
1961 births
Living people
People from Lidköping Municipality
Olympic medalists in tennis
Grand Slam (tennis) champions in men's doubles
People from Båstad Municipality
Medalists at the 1988 Summer Olympics
Ullevi TK players
ATP number 1 ranked doubles tennis players
Sportspeople from Västra Götaland County